The Donkey Rustlers is a 1968 novel for older children by Gerald Durrell, the well-known British writer and naturalist.

Plot summary 

It is set on a Greek island.  The plot involves two British children, Amanda and David, who regularly vacation on the island, and who are friends with two Greek children, Yani and another who has a speech impediment.  Yani has financial difficulties which mean that he is in danger of losing his land to the local mayor, the villain of the story.  Together they embark on a plot to help Yani by abducting all the donkeys in the village.  Amanda and David's father finds out what they are up to, but ends up surreptitiously assisting them.  Right at the end, after Yani's financial problems are solved, the villagers realise what the children were up to, but laugh it off as a joke, as they are sympathetic and glad to see the mayor defeated.

It has a slightly Enid Blyton-ish plot, with children getting up to adventures and fooling adults in a way which they would be unlikely to get away with in real life (although not all of the adults are fooled for all of the time, and it does touch on some mature issues in a few places).  However readers have enjoyed its imaginative feel-good plot, and well-drawn characters and location.  It is influenced by Durrell's own childhood on Corfu.

External links

Fantastic Fiction guide
some book covers

British children's novels
1968 British novels
Books by Gerald Durrell
Novels set in Greece
Fictional donkeys
Novels set on islands
1968 children's books
William Collins, Sons books